C. madagascariense  may refer to:

 Carlephyton madagascariense, a plant species
 Cephalostachyum madagascariense, a synonym for Cathariostachys madagascariensis, the Madagascar giant bamboo or Volohosy in Malagasy language, a bamboo species found in Madagascar